А (А а; italics: А а) is a letter of the Cyrillic script. The Cyrillic letter А is romanized using the Latin letter A.

History
The Cyrillic letter А was derived directly from the Greek letter Alpha. In the Cyrillic numeral system, the Cyrillic letter А has a value of 1.

Form
Throughout history, the Cyrillic letter А has had various shapes, but today is standardised on one that looks exactly like the Latin letter A, including the italic and lower case forms.

Usage
In most languages that use the Cyrillic alphabet – such as Bulgarian, Ukrainian, Belarusian, Russian, Rusyn, Serbian,  Macedonian and Montenegrin – the Cyrillic letter А represents the open central unrounded vowel . In Ingush and Chechen the Cyrillic letter А represents both the open back unrounded vowel  and the mid-central vowel . In Tuvan the letter can be written as a double vowel.

Related letters and other similar characters
A a : Latin letter A
Á á : Latin letter Á
Α α : Greek letter Alpha
Ă ă : Latin letter A with Breve
Â â : Latin letter A with Circumflex
Ā ā : Latin letter A with Macron
Æ æ : Latin letter Æ

Computing codes

See also
Cyrillic characters in Unicode

References

External links

Vowel letters